Noise music is a genre of music that is characterised by the expressive use of noise within a musical context. This type of music tends to challenge the distinction that is made in conventional musical practices between musical and non-musical sound. Noise music includes a wide range of musical styles and sound-based creative practices that feature noise as a primary aspect.

Noise music can feature acoustically or electronically generated noise, and both traditional and unconventional musical instruments. It may incorporate live machine sounds, non-musical vocal techniques, physically manipulated audio media, processed sound recordings, field recording, computer-generated noise, stochastic process, and other randomly produced electronic signals such as distortion, feedback, static, hiss and hum. There may also be emphasis on high volume levels and lengthy, continuous pieces. More generally noise music may contain aspects such as improvisation, extended technique, cacophony and indeterminacy. In many instances, conventional use of melody, harmony, rhythm or pulse is dispensed with.

The Futurist art movement (with most notably Luigi Russolo's Intonarumori and L'Arte dei Rumori (The Art of Noises) manifesto) was important for the development of the noise aesthetic, as was the Dada art movement (a prime example being the Antisymphony concert performed on April 30, 1919, in Berlin). In the 1920s, the French composer Edgard Varèse, when New York Dada associated via Marcel Duchamp and Francis Picabia's magazine 391, conceived of the elements of his music in terms of sound-masses; writing in the first half of the 1920s, Offrandes, Hyperprism, Octandre, and Intégrales. Varèse thought that "to stubbornly conditioned ears, anything new in music has always been called noise", and he posed the question: "what is music but organized noises?" 

Pierre Schaeffer's musique concrète 1948 compositions Cinq études de bruits (Five Noise Studies), that began with Etude aux Chemins de Fer (Railway Study) are key to this history. Etude aux Chemins de Fer consisted of a set of recordings made at the train station Gare des Batignolles in Paris that included six steam locomotives whistling and trains accelerating and moving over the tracks. The piece was derived entirely from recorded noise sounds that were not musical, thus a realization of Russolo's conviction that noise could be an acceptable source of music. Cinq études de bruits premiered via a radio broadcast on October 5, 1948, called Concert de bruits (Noise Concert).

Later in the 1960s, the Fluxus art movement played an important role, specifically the Fluxus artists Joe Jones, Yasunao Tone, George Brecht, Robert Watts, Wolf Vostell, Dieter Roth, Yoko Ono, Nam June Paik, Walter De Maria's Ocean Music, Milan Knížák's Broken Music Composition, early La Monte Young, Takehisa Kosugi, and the Analog #1 (Noise Study) (1961) by Fluxus-related composer James Tenney. 

Contemporary noise music is often associated with extreme volume and distortion. Notable genres that exploit such techniques include noise rock and no wave, industrial music, Japanoise, and postdigital music such as glitch. In the domain of experimental rock, examples include Lou Reed's Metal Machine Music and Sonic Youth. Other notable examples of composers and bands that feature noise based materials include works by Iannis Xenakis, Karlheinz Stockhausen, Helmut Lachenmann, Cornelius Cardew, Theatre of Eternal Music, Glenn Branca, Rhys Chatham, Ryoji Ikeda, Survival Research Laboratories, Whitehouse, Coil, Merzbow, Cabaret Voltaire, Psychic TV, Jean Tinguely's recordings of his sound sculpture (specifically Bascule VII), the music of Hermann Nitsch's Orgien Mysterien Theater, and La Monte Young's bowed gong works from the late 1960s.

Definitions
According to Danish noise and music theorist Torben Sangild, one single definition of noise in music is not possible. Sangild instead provides three basic definitions of noise: a musical acoustics definition, a second communicative definition based on distortion or disturbance of a communicative signal, and a third definition based in subjectivity (what is noise to one person can be meaningful to another; what was considered unpleasant sound yesterday is not today).

According to Murray Schafer there are four types of noise: unwanted noise, unmusical sound, any loud sound, and a disturbance in any signaling system (such as static on a telephone). Definitions regarding what is considered noise, relative to music, have changed over time. Ben Watson, in his article Noise as Permanent Revolution, points out that Ludwig van Beethoven's Grosse Fuge (1825) "sounded like noise" to his audience at the time. Indeed, Beethoven's publishers persuaded him to remove it from its original setting as the last movement of a string quartet. He did so, replacing it with a sparkling Allegro. They subsequently published it separately.

In attempting to define noise music and its value, Paul Hegarty (2007) cites the work of noted cultural critics Jean Baudrillard, Georges Bataille and Theodor Adorno and through their work traces the history of "noise". He defines noise at different times as "intrusive, unwanted", "lacking skill, not being appropriate" and "a threatening emptiness". He traces these trends starting with 18th-century concert hall music. Hegarty contends that it is John Cage's composition 4'33", in which an audience sits through four and a half minutes of "silence" (Cage 1973), that represents the beginning of noise music proper. For Hegarty, "noise music", as with 4'33", is that music made up of incidental sounds that represent perfectly the tension between "desirable" sound (properly played musical notes) and undesirable "noise" that make up all noise music from Erik Satie to NON to Glenn Branca. Writing about Japanese noise music, Hegarty suggests that "it is not a genre, but it is also a genre that is multiple, and characterized by this very multiplicity ... Japanese noise music can come in all styles, referring to all other genres ... but crucially asks the question of genre—what does it mean to be categorized, categorizable, definable?" (Hegarty 2007:133).

Writer Douglas Kahn, in his work Noise, Water, Meat: A History of Sound in the Arts (1999), discusses the use of noise as a medium and explores the ideas of Antonin Artaud, George Brecht, William Burroughs, Sergei Eisenstein, Fluxus, Allan Kaprow, Michael McClure, Yoko Ono, Jackson Pollock, Luigi Russolo, and Dziga Vertov.

In Noise: The Political Economy of Music (1985), Jacques Attali explores the relationship between noise music and the future of society by considering noise music as not merely reflective of, but importantly prefigurative of social transformations. He indicates that noise in music is a predictor of social change and demonstrates how noise acts as the subconscious of society—validating and testing new social and political realities. His disruption of the standard history of music and his inclusion of noise in an attempt to theorize culture cleared the way for many noise music theoretical studies.

Characteristics
Like much of modern and contemporary art, noise music takes characteristics of the perceived negative traits of noise mentioned below and uses them in aesthetic and imaginative ways.

In common use, the word noise means unwanted sound or noise pollution.
In electronics noise can refer to the electronic signal corresponding to acoustic noise (in an audio system) or the electronic signal corresponding to the (visual) noise commonly seen as 'snow' on a degraded television or video image. In signal processing or computing it can be considered data without meaning; that is, data that is not being used to transmit a signal, but is simply produced as an unwanted by-product of other activities. Noise can block, distort, or change the meaning of a message in both human and electronic communication.
White noise is a random signal (or process) with a flat power spectral density. In other words, the signal contains equal power within a fixed bandwidth at any center frequency. White noise is considered analogous to white light which contains all frequencies.

In much the same way the early modernists were inspired by naïve art, some contemporary digital art noise musicians are excited by the archaic audio technologies such as wire-recorders, the 8-track cartridge, and vinyl records. Many artists not only build their own noise-generating devices, but even their own specialized recording equipment and custom software (for example, the C++ software used in creating the viral symphOny by Joseph Nechvatal).

1910s–1960s

Origins
In "Futurism and Musical Notes", Daniele Lombardi discussed the French composer Carol-Bérard; a pupil of Isaac Albéniz, who composed a Symphony of Mechanical Forces in 1910, wrote on the problems of the instrumentation of noise music. and developed a notation system.

In 1913 Futurist artist Luigi Russolo wrote his manifesto, L'Arte dei Rumori, translated as The Art of Noises, stating that the industrial revolution had given modern men a greater capacity to appreciate more complex sounds. Russolo found traditional melodic music confining and envisioned noise music as its future replacement. He designed and constructed a number of noise-generating devices called intonarumori and assembled a noise orchestra to perform with them. Works entitled Risveglio di una città (Awakening of a City) and Convegno d'aeroplani e d'automobili (The Meeting of Aeroplanes and Automobiles) were both performed for the first time in 1914.

A performance of his Gran Concerto Futuristico (1917) was met with strong disapproval and violence from the audience, as Russolo himself had predicted. None of his intoning devices have survived, though recently some have been reconstructed and used in performances. Although Russolo's works bear little resemblance to contemporary noise music such as Japanoise, his efforts helped to introduce noise as a musical aesthetic and broaden the perception of sound as an artistic medium.

Antonio Russolo, Luigi's brother and fellow Italian Futurist composer, produced a recording of two works featuring the original intonarumori. The 1921 made phonograph with works entitled Corale and Serenata, combined conventional orchestral music set against the famous noise machines and is the only surviving sound recording.

An early Dada-related work from 1916 by Marcel Duchamp also worked with noise, but in an almost silent way. One of the found object Readymades of Marcel Duchamp, A Bruit Secret (With Hidden Noise), was a collaborative work that created a noise instrument that Duchamp accomplished with Walter Arensberg. What rattles inside when A Bruit Secret is shaken remains a mystery.

Found sound
In the same period the utilisation of found sound as a musical resource was starting to be explored. An early example is Parade, a performance produced at the Chatelet Theatre, Paris, on May 18, 1917, that was conceived by Jean Cocteau, with design by Pablo Picasso, choreography by Leonid Massine, and music by Eric Satie. The extra-musical materials used in the production were referred to as trompe l'oreille sounds by Cocteau and included a dynamo, Morse code machine, sirens, steam engine, airplane motor, and typewriters. Arseny Avraamov's composition Symphony of Factory Sirens involved navy ship sirens and whistles, bus and car horns, factory sirens, cannons, foghorns, artillery guns, machine guns, hydro-airplanes, a specially designed steam-whistle machine creating noisy renderings of Internationale and Marseillaise for a piece conducted by a team using flags and pistols when performed in the city of Baku in 1922. In 1923, Arthur Honegger created Pacific 231, a modernist musical composition that imitates the sound of a steam locomotive. Another example is Ottorino Respighi's 1924 orchestral piece Pines of Rome, which included the phonographic playback of a nightingale recording. Also in 1924, George Antheil created a work titled Ballet Mécanique with instrumentation that included 16 pianos, 3 airplane propellers, and 7 electric bells. The work was originally conceived as music for the Dada film of the same name, by Dudley Murphy and Fernand Léger, but in 1926 it premiered independently as a concert piece.

In 1930 Paul Hindemith and Ernst Toch recycled records to create sound montages and in 1936 Edgard Varèse experimented with records, playing them backwards, and at varying speeds. Varese had earlier used sirens to create what he called a "continuous flowing curve" of sound that he could not achieve with acoustic instruments. In 1931, Varese's Ionisation for 13 players featured 2 sirens, a lion's roar, and used 37 percussion instruments to create a repertoire of unpitched sounds making it the first musical work to be organized solely on the basis of noise. In remarking on Varese's contributions the American composer John Cage stated that Varese had "established the present nature of music" and that he had "moved into the field of sound itself while others were still discriminating 'musical tones' from noises".

In an essay written in 1937, Cage expressed an interest in using extra-musical materials and came to distinguish between found sounds, which he called noise, and musical sounds, examples of which included: rain, static between radio channels, and "a truck at fifty miles per hour". Essentially, Cage made no distinction, in his view all sounds have the potential to be used creatively. His aim was to capture and control elements of the sonic environment and employ a method of sound organisation, a term borrowed from Varese, to bring meaning to the sound materials. Cage began in 1939 to create a series of works that explored his stated aims, the first being Imaginary Landscape #1 for instruments including two variable speed turntables with frequency recordings.

In 1961, James Tenney composed Analogue #1: Noise Study (for tape) using computer synthesized noise and Collage No.1 (Blue Suede) (for tape) by sampling and manipulating a famous Elvis Presley recording.

Experimental music

In 1932, Bauhaus artists László Moholy-Nagy, Oskar Fischinger and Paul Arma experimented with modifying the physical contents of record grooves.

Under the influence of Henry Cowell in San Francisco in the late 1940s, Lou Harrison and John Cage began composing music for junk (waste) percussion ensembles, scouring junkyards and Chinatown antique shops for appropriately tuned brake drums, flower pots, gongs, and more.

In Europe, during the late 1940s, Pierre Schaeffer coined the term musique concrète to refer to the peculiar nature of sounds on tape, separated from the source that generated them initially. Pierre Schaeffer helped form Studio d'Essai of the Radiodiffusion-Télévision Française in Paris during World War II. Initially serving the French Resistance, Studio d'Essai became a hub for musical development centered around implementing electronic devices in compositions. It was from this group that musique concrète was developed. A type of electroacoustic music, musique concrète is characterized by its use of recorded sound, electronics, tape, animate and inanimate sound sources, and various manipulation techniques. The first of Schaeffer's Cinq études de bruits (Five Noise Etudes), called Étude aux chemins de fer (1948) consisted of transformed locomotive sounds. The last étude, Étude pathétique (1948), makes use of sounds recorded from sauce pans and canal boats. Cinq études de bruits was premiered via a radio broadcast on October 5, 1948, titled Concert de bruits.

Following musique concrète, other modernist art music composers such as Richard Maxfield, Karlheinz Stockhausen, Gottfried Michael Koenig, Pierre Henry, Iannis Xenakis, La Monte Young, and David Tudor, composed significant electronic, vocal, and instrumental works, sometimes using found sounds. In late 1947, Antonin Artaud recorded  (To Have Done with the Judgment of God), an audio piece full of the seemingly random cacophony of xylophonic sounds mixed with various percussive elements, mixed with the noise of alarming human cries, screams, grunts, onomatopoeia, and glossolalia. In 1949, Nouveau Réalisme artist Yves Klein wrote The Monotone Symphony (formally The Monotone-Silence Symphony, conceived 1947–1948), a 40-minute orchestral piece that consisted of a single 20-minute sustained chord (followed by a 20-minute silence) — showing how the sound of one drone could make music. Also in 1949, Pierre Boulez befriended John Cage, who was visiting Paris to do research on the music of Erik Satie. John Cage had been pushing music in even more startling directions during the war years, writing for prepared piano, junkyard percussion, and electronic gadgetry.

In 1951, Cage's Imaginary Landscape #4, a work for twelve radio receivers, was premiered in New York. Performance of the composition necessitated the use of a score that contained indications for various wavelengths, durations, and dynamic levels, all of which had been determined using chance operations.
A year later in 1952, Cage applied his aleatoric methods to tape-based composition. Also in 1952, Karlheinz Stockhausen completed a modest musique concrète student piece entitled Etude. Cage's work resulted in his famous work Williams Mix, which was made up of some six hundred tape fragments arranged according to the demands of the I Ching. Cage's early radical phase reached its height that summer of 1952, when he unveiled the first art "happening" at Black Mountain College, and 4'33", the so-called controversial "silent piece". The premiere of 4'33" was performed by David Tudor. The audience saw him sit at the piano, and close the lid of the piano. Some time later, without having played any notes, he opened the lid. A while after that, again having played nothing, he closed the lid. And after a period of time, he opened the lid once more and rose from the piano. The piece had passed without a note being played, in fact without Tudor or anyone else on stage having made any deliberate sound, although he timed the lengths on a stopwatch while turning the pages of the score. Only then could the audience recognize what Cage insisted upon: that there is no such thing as silence. Noise is always happening that makes musical sound. In 1957, Edgard Varèse created on tape an extended piece of electronic music using noises created by scraping, thumping and blowing titled Poème électronique.

In 1960, John Cage completed his noise composition Cartridge Music for phono cartridges with foreign objects replacing the 'stylus' and small sounds amplified by contact microphones. Also in 1960, Nam June Paik composed Fluxusobjekt for fixed tape and hand-controlled tape playback head. On May 8, 1960, six young Japanese musicians, including Takehisa Kosugi and Yasunao Tone, formed the Group Ongaku with two tape recordings of noise music: Automatism and Object. These recordings made use of a mixture of traditional musical instruments along with a vacuum cleaner, a radio, an oil drum, a doll, and a set of dishes. Moreover, the speed of the tape recording was manipulated, further distorting the sounds being recorded. Canada's Nihilist Spasm Band, the world's longest-running noise act, was formed in 1965 in London, Ontario, and continues to perform and record to this day, having survived to work with many of the newer generation which they themselves had influenced, such as Thurston Moore of Sonic Youth and Jojo Hiroshige of Hijokaidan. In 1967, Musica Elettronica Viva, a live acoustic/electronic improvisational group formed in Rome, made a recording titled SpaceCraft using contact microphones on such "non-musical" objects as panes of glass and motor oil cans that was recorded at the Akademie der Kunste in Berlin. At the end of the sixties, they took part in the collective noise action called Lo Zoo initiated by the artist Michelangelo Pistoletto.

The art critic Rosalind Krauss argued that by 1968 artists such as Robert Morris, Robert Smithson, and Richard Serra had "entered a situation the logical conditions of which can no longer be described as modernist." Sound art found itself in the same condition, but with an added emphasis on distribution. Antiform process art became the terms used to describe this postmodern post-industrial culture and the process by which it is made. Serious art music responded to this conjuncture in terms of intense noise, for example the La Monte Young Fluxus composition 89 VI 8 C. 1:42–1:52 AM Paris Encore from Poem For Chairs, Tables, Benches, Etc. Young's composition Two Sounds (1960) was composed for amplified percussion and window panes and his Poem for Tables, Chairs and Benches, Etc. (1960) used the sounds of furniture scraping across the floor.

Popular music

Freak Out!, the 1966 debut album by The Mothers of Invention made use of avant-garde sound collage—particularly the closing track "The Return of the Son of Monster Magnet". The same year, art rock group The Velvet Underground made their first recording while produced by Andy Warhol, a track entitled "Noise".

"Tomorrow Never Knows" is the final track of The Beatles' 1966 studio album Revolver; credited as a Lennon–McCartney song, it was written primarily by John Lennon with major contributions to the arrangement by Paul McCartney. The track included looped tape effects. For the track, McCartney supplied a bag of -inch audio tape loops he had made at home after listening to Stockhausen's Gesang der Jünglinge. By disabling the erase head of a tape recorder and then spooling a continuous loop of tape through the machine while recording, the tape would constantly overdub itself, creating a saturation effect, a technique also used in musique concrète. The Beatles would continue these efforts with "Revolution 9", a track produced in 1968 for The White Album. It made sole use of sound collage, credited to Lennon–McCartney, but created primarily by John Lennon with assistance from George Harrison and Yoko Ono.

In 1975, Ned Lagin released an album of electronic noise music full of spacey rumblings and atmospherics filled with burps and bleeps entitled Seastones on Round Records. The album was recorded in stereo quadraphonic sound and featured guest performances by members of the Grateful Dead, including Jerry Garcia playing treated guitar and Phil Lesh playing electronic Alembic bass. David Crosby, Grace Slick and other members of the Jefferson Airplane also appear on the album.

1970s–present

Noise rock and no wave

Lou Reed's double LP Metal Machine Music (1975) is cited as containing the primary characteristics of what would in time become a genre known as noise music. The album, recorded on a three speed Uher machine and mastered/engineered by Bob Ludwig, is an early, well-known example of commercial studio noise music that the music critic Lester Bangs has sarcastically called the "greatest album ever made in the history of the human eardrum". It has also been cited as one of the "worst albums of all time". In 1975, RCA also released a Quadrophonic version of the Metal Machine Music recording that was produced by playing the master tape back both forward and backward, and by flipping the tape over. Reed was well aware of the drone music of La Monte Young and cites him as a major influence on Metal Machine Music. Young's Theatre of Eternal Music was a proto-minimal music noise group in the mid-60s with John Cale, Marian Zazeela, Henry Flynt, Angus Maclise, Tony Conrad, and others. The Theatre of Eternal Music's discordant sustained notes and loud amplification had influenced Cale's subsequent contribution to The Velvet Underground in his use of both discordance and feedback. Cale and Conrad have released noise music recordings they made during the mid-sixties, such as Cale's Inside the Dream Syndicate series (The Dream Syndicate being the alternative name given by Cale and Conrad to their collective work with Young).

The aptly named noise rock fuses rock to noise, usually with recognizable "rock" instrumentation, but with greater use of distortion and electronic effects, varying degrees of atonality, improvisation, and white noise. One notable band of this genre is Sonic Youth, who took inspiration from the No Wave composers Glenn Branca and Rhys Chatham (himself a student of La Monte Young). Marc Masters, in his book on the No Wave, points out that aggressively innovative early dark noise groups like Mars and DNA drew on punk rock, avant-garde minimalism and performance art. Important in this noise trajectory are the nine nights of noise music called Noise Fest that was organized by Thurston Moore of Sonic Youth in the NYC art space White Columns in June 1981 followed by the Speed Trials noise rock series organized by Live Skull members in May 1983.

Industrial music

In the 1970s, the concept of art itself expanded and groups like Survival Research Laboratories, Borbetomagus and Elliott Sharp embraced and extended the most dissonant and least approachable aspects of these musical/spatial concepts. Around the same time, the first postmodern wave of industrial noise music appeared with The Pop Group, Throbbing Gristle, Cabaret Voltaire, and NON (aka Boyd Rice). These cassette culture releases often featured zany tape editing, stark percussion and repetitive loops distorted to the point where they may degrade into harsh noise. In the 1970s and 1980s, industrial noise groups like Killing Joke, Throbbing Gristle, Mark Stewart & the Mafia, Coil, Laibach, Thee Temple ov Psychick Youth, Smegma, Nurse with Wound and  Einstürzende Neubauten performed industrial noise music mixing loud metal percussion, guitars, and unconventional "instruments" (such as jackhammers and bones) in elaborate stage performances. These industrial artists experimented with varying degrees of noise production techniques. Interest in the use of shortwave radio also developed at this time, particularly evident in the recordings and live performances of John Duncan. Other postmodern art movements influential to post-industrial noise art are Conceptual Art and the Neo-Dada use of techniques such as assemblage, montage, bricolage, and appropriation. Bands like Test Dept, Clock DVA, Factrix, Autopsia, Nocturnal Emissions, Whitehouse, Severed Heads, Sutcliffe Jügend, and SPK soon followed.
The sudden post-industrial affordability of home cassette recording technology in the 1970s, combined with the simultaneous influence of punk rock, established the No Wave aesthetic, and instigated what is commonly referred to as noise music today.

Japanese noise music

Since the early 1980s, Japan has produced a significant output of characteristically harsh artists and bands, sometimes referred to as Japanoise, with names such as Government Alpha, Alienlovers in Amagasaki and Koji Tano, and perhaps the best known being Merzbow (pseudonym for the Japanese noise artist Masami Akita who himself was inspired by the Dada artist Kurt Schwitters's Merz art project of psychological collage). In the late 1970s and early 1980s, Akita took Metal Machine Music as a point of departure and further abstracted the noise aesthetic by freeing the sound from guitar based feedback alone. According to Hegarty (2007), "in many ways it only makes sense to talk of noise music since the advent of various types of noise produced in Japanese music, and in terms of quantity this is really to do with the 1990s onwards ... with the vast growth of Japanese noise, finally, noise music becomes a genre". Other key Japanese noise artists that contributed to this upsurge of activity include Hijokaidan, Boredoms, C.C.C.C., Incapacitants, KK Null, Yamazaki Maso's Masonna, Solmania, K2, The Gerogerigegege and Hanatarash. Nick Cain of The Wire identifies the "primacy of Japanese Noise artists like Merzbow, Hijokaidan and Incapacitants" as one of the major developments in noise music since 1990.

Post-digital music

Following the wake of industrial noise, noise rock, no wave, and harsh noise, there has been a flood of noise musicians whose ambient, microsound, or glitch-based work is often subtler to the ear. Kim Cascone refers to this development as a postdigital movement and describes it as an "aesthetic of failure." Some of this music has seen wide distribution thanks to peer-to-peer file sharing services and netlabels offering free releases. Steve Goodman characterizes this widespread outpouring of free noise based media as a "noise virus."

Compilations
 An Anthology of Noise & Electronic Music Volumes 1–7 Sub Rosa, Various Artists (1920–2012)
 Bip-Hop Generation (2001–2008) Volumes 1–9, various artists, Paris
 Independent Dark Electronics Volume #1 (2008) IDE
 Japanese Independent Music (2000) various artists, Paris Sonore
 Just Another Asshole #5 (1981) compilation LP (CD reissue 1995 on Atavistic #ALP39CD), producers: Barbara Ess and Glenn Branca
 New York Noise, Vol. 1–3 (2003, 2006, 2006) Soul Jazz B00009OYSE, B000CHYHOG, B000HEZ5CC
 Noise May-Day 2003, various artists, Coquette Japan CD Catalog#: NMD-2003
 No New York (1978) Antilles, (2006) Lilith, B000B63ISE
 $un of the $eventh $ister 80 hour disc (2013) venting gallery SLV DC 780.905 SU7S 
 Women take back the Noise Compilation (2006) ubuibi
 The Allegheny White Fish Tapes (2009), Tobacco, Rad Cult
 The Japanese-American Noise Treaty (1995) CD, Relapse
 New York Noise hour music video television program

See also

References

Sources

 Albright, Daniel (ed.) Modernism and Music: An Anthology of Source. Chicago: University Of Chicago Press, 2004.
 Attali, Jacques. Noise: The Political Economy of Music, translated by Brian Massumi, foreword by Fredric Jameson, afterword by Susan McClary. Minneapolis: University of Minnesota Press, 1985.
 Atton, Chris (2011). "Fan Discourse and the Construction of Noise Music as a Genre". Journal of Popular Music Studies, Volume 23, Issue 3, pages 324–42, September 2011.
 Bangs, Lester. Psychotic Reactions and Carburetor Dung: The Work of a Legendary Critic, collected writings,edited by Greil Marcus. Anchor Press, 1988.
 Biro, Matthew. The Dada Cyborg: Visions of the New Human in Weimar Berlin. Minneapolis: University of Minnesota Press, 2009.
 Cage, John. Silence: Lectures and Writings. Wesleyan University Press, 1961. Reprinted 1973.
 Cage, John. "The Future of Music: Credo (1937)". In John Cage, Documentary Monographs in Modern Art, edited by Richard Kostelanetz, Praeger Publishers, 1970
 Cahoone, Lawrence. From Modernism to Postmodernism: An Anthology. Cambridge, Mass: Blackwell, 1996.
 Cain, Nick  "Noise" in The Wire Primers: A Guide to Modern Music, Rob Young, ed., London: Verso, 2009.
 Cascone, Kim. "The Aesthetics of Failure: 'Post-Digital' Tendencies in Contemporary Computer Music".Computer Music Journal 24, no. 4 (Winter 2002): 12–18.
 
 Cowell, Henry. The Joys of Noise in Audio Culture. Readings in Modern Music, edited by Christoph Cox and Dan Warner, pp. 22–24. New York: Continuum, 2004.  (hardcover)  (pbk)
 Ocean Music by De Maria, Walter (1968)]
 Gere, Charles. Art, Time and Technology: Histories of the Disappearing Body. Oxford: Berg Publishers, 2005.
 
 Goodman, Steve. 2009. "Contagious Noise: From Digital Glitches to Audio Viruses". In The Spam Book: On Viruses, Porn and Other Anomalies From the Dark Side of Digital Culture, edited by Jussi Parikka and Tony D. Sampson, 125–40.. Cresskill, New Jersey: Hampton Press.
 Hecht, Eugene. Optics, 4th edition. Boston: Pearson Education, 2001.
 Hegarty, Paul. 2004. "Full with Noise: Theory and Japanese Noise Music". In Life in the Wires, edited by Arthur Kroker and Marilouise Kroker, 86–98. Victoria, Canada: NWPCtheory Books.
 Hegarty, Paul. Noise/Music: A History. London: Continuum International Publishing Group, 2007.
 Piekut, Benjamin. Experimentalism Otherwise: The New York Avant-Garde and Its Limits. Berkeley: University of California Press, 2012.
Kahn, Douglas. Noise, Water, Meat: A History of Sound in the Arts. Cambridge: MIT Press, 1999.
Kelly, Caleb. Cracked Media: The Sound of Malfunction Cambridge, Ma.: MIT Press, 2009.
Kemp, Mark. 1992. "She Who Laughs Last: Yoko Ono Reconsidered".  Option Magazine (July–August): 74–81.
Krauss, Rosalind E. 1979. The Originality of the Avant Garde and Other Modernist Myths. Cambridge: MIT Press. Reprinted as Sculpture in the Expanded Field. Cambridge: MIT Press, 1986.
LaBelle, Brandon. 2006. Background Noise: Perspectives on Sound Art. New York and London: Continuum International Publishing.
Landy, Leigh (2007),Understanding the Art of Sound Organization, Cambridge, Massachusetts: MIT Press, xiv, 303p.
Lewisohn, Mark. 1988. The Beatles Recording Sessions. New York: Harmony Books.
Lombardi, Daniele. 1981. "Futurism and Musical Notes". Artforum January 1981. 
 
 
 
 Masters, Marc. 2007. No Wave London: Black Dog Publishing.
 Mereweather, Charles (ed.). 2007. Art Anti-Art Non-Art. Los Angeles: Getty Research Institute.
 
 Nechvatal, Joseph. 2012. Immersion Into Noise. Ann Arbor: Open Humanities Press. .
 Nechvatal, Joseph. 2000. Towards a Sound Ecstatic Electronica. New York: The Thing Post.thing.net
 
 Pedersen, Steven Mygind. 2007. Notes on Joseph Nechvatal: Viral SymphOny. Alfred, New York: Institute for Electronic Arts, School of Art & Design, Alfred University.
 Petrusich, Amanda. "Interview: Lou Reed Pitchfork net. (Accessed 13 September 2009)
 Priest, Eldritch. "Music Noise". In his Boring Formless Nonsense: Experimental Music and The Aesthetics of Failure, 128–39. London: Bloomsbury Publishing; New York: Bloomsbury Academic, 2013. ;  (pbk).
 Rice, Ron. 1994. A Brief History of Anti-Records and Conceptual Records. Unfiled: Music under New Technology 0402 [i.e., vol. 1, no. 2]: Republished online, Ubuweb Papers (Accessed 4 December 2009).
 Ross, Alex. 2007. The Rest Is Noise: Listening to the Twentieth Century. New York: Farrar, Straus and Giroux.
 Sangild, Torben. 2002. The Aesthetics of Noise. Copenhagen: Datanom. .  Reprinted at UbuWeb
 Sanouillet, Michel, and Elmer Peterson (eds.). 1989. The Writings of Marcel Duchamp. New York: Da Capo Press.
 Smith, Owen. 1998. Fluxus: The History of an Attitude. San Diego: San Diego State University Press.
 
 Tunbridge, Laura. 2011. The Song Cycle. Cambridge and New York: Cambridge University Press. .
Watson, Ben. "Noise as Permanent Revolution: or, Why Culture Is a Sow Which Devours Its Own Farrow". In Noise & Capitalism, edited by Anthony and Mattin Iles, 104–20. Kritika Series. Donostia-San Sebastián: Arteleku Audiolab, 2009.
Watson, Steven. 2003. Factory Made: Warhol and the Sixties. New York: Pantheon.
Weiss, Allen S. 1995. Phantasmic Radio. Durham NC:  Duke University Press.
Young, Rob (ed.). 2009. The Wire Primers: A Guide To Modern Music. London: Verso.
Van Nort, Doug. (2006), Noise/music and representation systems, Organised Sound, 11(2), Cambridge University Press, pp 173–178.

Further reading

 Álvarez-Fernández, Miguel. "Dissonance, Sex and Noise: (Re)Building (Hi)Stories of Electroacoustic Music". In ICMC 2005: Free Sound Conference Proceedings. Barcelona: International Computer Music Conference; International Computer Music Association; SuviSoft Oy Ltd., 2005.
 Thomas Bey William Bailey, Unofficial Release: Self-Released And Handmade Audio In Post-Industrial Society, Belsona Books Ltd., 2012
 Barthes, Roland. "Listening". In his The Responsibility of Forms: Critical Essays on Music, Art, and Representation, translated from the French by Richard Howard. New York: Hill and Wang, 1985.  Reprinted Berkeley: University of California Press, 1991.  (pbk.)
 Brassier, Ray. "Genre is Obsolete". Multitudes, no. 28 (Spring 2007) Multitudes.samizdat.net.
 Cobussen, Marcel. "Noise and Ethics: On Evan Parker and Alain Badiou". Culture, Theory & Critique, 46(1) pp. 29–42. 2005.
 Collins, Nicolas (ed.) "Leonardo Music Journal" Vol 13: "Groove, Pit and Wave: Recording, Transmission and Music"  2003.
 Court, Paula. New York Noise: Art and Music from the New York Underground 1978–88. London: Soul Jazz Publishing, in association with Soul Jazz Records, 2007. 
 DeLone, Leon  (ed.), Aspects of Twentieth-Century Music. Englewood Cliffs, New Jersey: Prentice-Hall, 1975.
 Demers, Joanna. Listening Through The Noise. New York: Oxford University Press. 2010.
 Dempsey, Amy. Art in the Modern Era: A Guide to Schools and Movements. New York: Harry A. Abrams, 2002.
 Doss, Erika. Twentieth-Century American Art. Oxford and New York: Oxford University Press, 2002
 Foege, Alec. Confusion Is Next: The Sonic Youth Story. New York: St. Martin's Press, 1994.
 Gere, Charlie. Digital Culture, second edition. London: Reaktion, 2000. 
 Goldberg, RoseLee. Performance: Live Art Since 1960. New York: Harry N. Abrams, 1998.
 Goodman, Steve a.k.a. kode9. Sonic Warfare: Sound, Affect, and the Ecology of Fear. Cambridge, Ma.: MIT Press, 2010.
 Hainge, Greg (ed.). Culture, Theory and Critique 46, no. 1 (Issue on Noise, 2005)
 Harrison, Charles, and Paul Wood. Art in Theory, 1900–2000: An Anthology of Changing Ideas. Oxford: Blackwell Publishing, 1992.
 Harrison, Thomas J. 1910: The Emancipation of Dissonance. Berkeley: University of California Press, 1996.
 Hegarty, Paul The Art of Noise. Talk given to Visual Arts Society at University College Cork, 2005.
 Hegarty, Paul. Noise/Music: A History. New York, London: Continuum, 2007.  (cloth);  (pbk).
 Hensley, Chad. "The Beauty of Noise: An Interview with Masami Akita of Merzbow". In Audio Culture: Readings in Modern Music, edited by C. Cox and Dan Warner, pp. 59–61. New York: Continuum, 2004.
 Helmholtz, Hermann von. On the Sensations of Tone as a Physiological Basis for the Theory of Music, 2nd English edition, translated by Alexander J. Ellis. New York: Longmans & Co. 1885. Reprinted New York: Dover Publications, 1954.
 Hinant, Guy-Marc. "TOHU BOHU: Considerations on the nature of noise, in 78 fragments". In Leonardo Music Journal Vol 13: Groove, Pit and Wave: Recording, Transmission and Music. 2003. pp. 43–47
 Huyssen, Andreas. Twilight Memories: Marking Time in a Culture of Amnesia. New York: Routledge, 1995.
 Iles, Anthony & Mattin (eds) Noise & Capitalism. Donostia-San Sebastián: Arteleku Audiolab (Kritika series). 2009.
 Juno, Andrea, and Vivian Vale (eds.). Industrial Culture Handbook. RE/Search 6/7. San Francisco: RE/Search Publications, 1983. 
 Kahn, Douglas, and Gregory Whitehead (eds.). Wireless Imagination: Sound, Radio and the Avant-Garde. Cambridge, Ma.: MIT Press, 1992.
 Kocur, Zoya, and Simon Leung. Theory in Contemporary Art Since 1985. Boston: Blackwell Publishing, 2005.
 LaBelle, Brandon. Noise Aesthetics in Background Noise: Perspectives on Sound Art, New York and London: Continuum International Publishing, pp 222–225.  2006.
 Lander, Dan. Sound by Artists. Toronto: Art Metropole, 1990.
 Licht, Alan. Sound Art: Beyond Music, between Categories. New York: Rizzoli, 2007.
 Lombardi, Daniele. Futurism and Musical Notes, translated by Meg Shore. Artforum  
 Malaspina, Cecile. Introduction by Brassier, Ray. An Epistemology of Noise. Bloomsbury Academic. 2018.
 Malpas, Simon. The Postmodern. New York: Routledge, 2005.
 McGowan, John P. Postmodernism and Its Critics.  Ithaca: Cornell University Press, 1991.
 Miller, Paul D. [a.k.a. DJ Spooky] (ed.). Sound Unbound: Sampling Digital Music and Culture. Cambridge, Ma.: MIT Press, 2008.
 Morgan, Robert P. "A New Musical Reality: Futurism, Modernism, and 'The Art of Noises'", Modernism/Modernity 1, no. 3 (September 1994): 129–51. Reprinted  at UbuWeb.
 Moore, Thurston. Mix Tape: The Art of Cassette Culture. Seattle: Universe, 2004.
 Nechvatal, Joseph. Immersion Into Noise. Open Humanities Press in conjunction with the University of Michigan Library's Scholarly Publishing Office. Ann Arbor. 2011.
 David Novak, Japanoise: Music at the Edge of Circulation, Duke University Press. 2013
 Nyman, Michael. Experimental Music: Cage and Beyond, 2nd edition. Music in the Twentieth Century. Cambridge and New York: Cambridge University Press, 1999. (cloth)  (pbk)
 Pratella, Francesco Balilla. "Manifesto of Futurist Musicians" from Apollonio, Umbro, ed. Documents of 20th-century Art: Futurist Manifestos. Brain, Robert, R.W. Flint, J.C. Higgitt, and Caroline Tisdall, trans. New York: Viking Press, pp. 31–38. 1973.
 Popper, Frank. From Technological to Virtual Art. Cambridge: MIT Press/Leonardo Books, 2007.
 Popper, Frank. Art of the Electronic Age. New York: Harry N. Abrams; London: Thames & Hudson, 1993.  (New York);  (New York);  (London); Paperback reprint, New York: Thames & Hudson, 1997. .
 Ruhrberg, Karl, Manfred Schneckenburger, Christiane Fricke, and Ingo F. Walther. Art of the 20th Century. Cologne and London: Taschen, 2000. 
 Russolo, Luigi. The Art of Noises. New York: Pendragon, 1986.
 Samson, Jim. Music in Transition: A Study of Tonal Expansion and Atonality, 1900–1920. New York: W. W. Norton & Company, 1977.
 Schaeffer, Pierre. "Solfege de l'objet sonore". Le Solfège de l'Objet Sonore (Music Theory of the Sound Object), a sound recording that accompanied Traité des Objets Musicaux (Treatise on Musical Objects) by Pierre Schaeffer, was issued by ORTF (French Broadcasting Authority) as a long-playing record in 1967.
 Schafer, R. Murray. The Soundscape Rochester, Vt: Destiny Books, 1993. 
 Sheppard, Richard. Modernism-Dada-Postmodernism. Chicago: Northwestern University Press, 2000.
 Steiner, Wendy. Venus in Exile: The Rejection of Beauty in 20th-Century Art. New York: The Free Press, 2001.
 Stuart, Caleb. "Damaged Sound: Glitching and Skipping Compact Discs in the Audio of Yasunao Tone, Nicolas Collins and Oval" In Leonardo Music Journal Vol 13: Groove, Pit and Wave: Recording, Transmission and Music. 2003. pp. 47–52
 Tenney, James. A History of "Consonance" and "Dissonance". White Plains, New York: Excelsior; New York: Gordon and Breach, 1988.
 Thompson, Emily. The Soundscape of Modernity: Architectural Acoustics and the Culture of Listening in America, 1900–1933. Cambridge, Ma.: MIT Press, 2002.
 Voegelin, Salome. Listening to Noise and Silence: Towards a Philosophy of Sound Art. London: Continuum. 2010. Chapter 2 Noise, pp. 41–76.
 Woods, Michael. Art of the Western World. Mandaluyong: Summit Books, 1989.
 Woodward, Brett (ed.). Merzbook: The Pleasuredome of Noise. Melbourne and Cologne: Extreme, 1999.
 Young, Rob (ed.) Undercurrents: The Hidden Wiring of Modern Music. London: Continuum Books. 2002.

External links

 Nor Noise 119 mins 2004 documentary film by Tom Hovinbole at UbuWeb.
 Noise A short noise music documentary film by N.O. Smith
 Freshwidow.com, Marcel Duchamp playing and discussing his noise ready-made With Hidden Noise
 Paul Hegarty, Full With Noise: Theory and Japanese Noise Music on Ctheory.net
 The Future of Music: Credo, John Cage (1937) from Silence, John Cage, Wesleyan University Press
 Alphamanbeast's noise directory Information base with links to noise artists and labels
 White noise in wave(.wav) format (1 minute)
 UBU.armob.ca La Monte Young's 89 VI 8 c. 1:42–1:52 AM Paris Encore (10:33) on Tellus Audio Cassette Magazine archive hosted at UbuWeb
 Noise generator to explore different types of noise
 PNF-library.org, Free Noise Manifesto
 Torben Sangild: "The Aesthetics of Noise"
 UBU.com, mp3 audio files of the noise music of Luigi Russolo on UbuWeb
 Noiseweb
 List of noise bands in the Noise Wiki created by noise artists for noise artists
 #13 Power Electronics at Tellus Audio Cassette Magazine housed at UbuWeb
 MP3 files by harsh noise artists
 UBU.com, Wolf Vostell's De/Collage LP Fluxus Multhipla, Italy (1980) at UbuWeb
 UBU.wfmu.org, noise music of Antonio Russolo from Tellus Audio Cassette Magazine
 Noise.as, Noise: NZ/Japan
 UBU.artmob.ca Walter De Maria Ocean Music (1968)
 Torben Sangild: "The Aesthetics of Noise"
 Japanoise.net 
 Dotdotmusic.com, Paul Hegarty, General Ecology of Sound: Japanese Noise Music as Low Form (2005)
 UBU.artmob.ca, audio excerpt from The Monotone Symphony by Yves Klein
 UBU.com, Genesis P-Orridge on the origins of Throbbing Gristle: interview by Tony Oursler on UbuWeb
 UBU.com, Group Ongaku (1960–61) at Ubuweb Recorded in 1960 & 1961 at Sogetsu Art Center, Tokyo
 RWM.macba.cat, mp3 radio lecture on Fluxus noise music
 Continuo.wordpress.com, Sound recordings from Nicolas Schöffer's spatiodynamic sculptures sourced from the DVD of an exhibition at Espace Gantner, France, 2004, titled Précurseur de l'art cybernétique.
 Marc Weidenbaum, "Classic Tellus Noise MP3s (Controlled Bleeding, Merzbow, etc.)", Classic Tellus Audio Cassette Magazine Noise
 Nam June Paik in UbuWeb Sound

 
Cassette culture 1970s–1990s